Farvel may refer to:

 "Farvel", a 2016 song by Jimilian
 Farvel, a 2017 album by Gulddreng
 "Farvel", a 2012 song by Node and Gilli
 Philip Kovolick (1908–c. 1971), New York mobster known as Joseph Farvel
 Farvel, Rune, a 1986 book by Marit Kaldhol